The Venus Project is a nonprofit organization founded by a Florida-based, architect and social engineer Jacque Fresco. Fresco with his partner Roxanne Meadows founded this organization with a socioeconomic model to develop a resource-based economy for human beings utilizing technology.

History
Fresco worked on the “Project Americana” before The Venus Project, from 1955 to 1959. The project was mainly about environmental, traffic, and floodgates concerns.

In 1970, Fresco formed an organization, Sociocybereneering Inc, based on the idea of technology and energy conservation strategies. Later, Fresco and his partner Roxanne Meadows purchased 21 acres of farmland in Venus, an unincorporated community in southeastern Highlands County, Florida for conducting different types of research about their futuristic plan of architectural design and city models. Fresco & Meadows then created buildings and other infrastructure to work on their idea of energy-efficient cities. According to The New York Times, initially, they supported the project by selling books and lecture videos.
In 1980, Fresco, established a research center to experiment on resource-based economy and later named it, “The Venus Project”, by a town name, Venus. In 2010, Fresco and Meadows traveled to 20 countries to present “The Venus Project”.
In June 2012, a Swedish documentary and fiction director, Maja Borg screened her film, Future My Love, at the Edinburgh International Film Festival featuring the work of Fresco and Roxanne Meadows.

References

External links
   The view from Venus

Non-profit organizations based in Florida